The Communauté de communes de la Visandre is a former federation of municipalities (communauté de communes) in the Seine-et-Marne département and in the Île-de-France région of France. It was created in December 2000. It was dissolved in 2010.

Composition 
The Communauté de communes comprised the following communes:
La Croix-en-Brie
Gastins
Jouy-le-Châtel
Pécy
Vaudoy-en-Brie

See also
Communes of the Seine-et-Marne department

References 

Former commune communities of Seine-et-Marne